Leptobrachella alpina is a frog species in the family Megophryidae. It is endemic to Jingdong County in Yunnan, China, where it occurs in Wuliangshan National Nature Reserve; there is also a questionable record from Tianling in Guangxi.

Breeding takes place in streams. It is threatened by habitat loss and degradation, primarily caused by small-scale subsistence wood extraction. Although occurring in the Wuliangshan Reserve, better management outside its core area is needed.

References

alpina
Frogs of China
Endemic fauna of Yunnan
Amphibians described in 1990
Taxonomy articles created by Polbot